For the state pageant affiliated with Miss Teen USA, see Miss Maine Teen USA

The Miss Maine's Outstanding Teen competition is the pageant that selects the representative for the U.S. state of Maine in the Miss America's Outstanding Teen pageant.

Lexi Alcott of Windsor was crowned Miss Maine's Outstanding Teen on June 18, 2022 at the Freeport Performing Arts Center in Freeport, Maine. She competed for the title of Miss America's Outstanding Teen 2023 at the Hyatt Regency Dallas in Dallas, Texas on August 12, 2022.

Results summary 
The year in parentheses indicates year of Miss America's Outstanding Teen competition the award/placement was garnered.

Awards

Non-finalist Awards 
 Non-finalist Talent: Madison Leslie (2016)

Other Awards 

 Outstanding Vocal: Madison Leslie (2016)

Winners

References

External links
 Official website

Maine
Maine culture
Women in Maine